Miroslav Moravec (6 January 1939, in Prague – 29 March 2009, in Prague) was a Czech actor. He starred in the film Poslední propadne peklu under director Ludvík Ráža in 1982.

Moravec voiced Junior in the Czech dub of Home on the Range (2004).

Selected filmography
 One Silver Piece (1976)
 Poslední propadne peklu (1982)
 Byl jednou jeden polda (1995)

References

1939 births
2009 deaths
Male actors from Prague
Czech male film actors
Czech male stage actors
Czech male voice actors
Czechoslovak male voice actors